The New Jersey Board of Public Utilities (NJBPU) is a regulatory authority in New Jersey "with authority to oversee the regulated utilities, which in turn provide critical services such as natural gas, electricity, water, telecommunications and cable television. The law requires the Board to ensure safe, adequate, and proper utility services at reasonable rates for customers." NJBPU regulates natural gas, electricity, water, telecommunications and cable television services. NJBPU's five-member Board addresses issues of consumer protection, energy reform, deregulation of energy and telecommunications services and the restructuring of utility rates to encourage energy conservation and competitive pricing in the industry. NJBPU monitors utility service and responds to consumer complaints.

The Board of Public Utilities administers incentive programs that support the development of solar power in New Jersey and offshore wind power in New Jersey.

History
NJBPU traces its roots back to 1910, with the formation of the Board of Public Utility Commissioners, which then covered gas, electricity, water and communications, as well as railroads and interstate commerce. In 1977, NJBPU was placed within the Department of Environmental Protection and Energy. In 1994, NJBPU was moved to its current position within the New Jersey Department of the Treasury.

, the President of the New Jersey Board of Public Utilities is Joseph L. Fiordaliso, who has served as a commissioner since 2006 and as Board President since January 2018. The other four commissioners are Robert M. Gordon (since April 2018), Mary-Anna Holden (since January 2012) and Dianne Solomon (since June 2013), and Zenon Christodoulou (since August 2022).

Past commissioners include Upendra J. Chivukula (2014–2022), Richard Mroz (2014–2018), Nicholas Asselta (2008–2012), Jeanne Fox (2002–2014), Robert M. Hanna (2011–2014), and Lee Solomon (2010–2011).

References

External links

Official website

Board of Public Utilities
Public utilities commissions of the United States